Shandong Molong Petroleum Machinery Company Limited, or Shandong Molong, is a private petroleum machinery manufacturer in Shouguang, Shandong, China. It offers oil well pump, sucker rods, oil well pipes and other oil drilling and oil extraction machinery products. Petrochina and Sinopec are its major customers.

History
1987: It was founded by Mr. Zhang En-rong in a name of Shouguang Petroleum Machinery Accessories Company Limited.
1989: Its name changed to Shouguang Petroleum Machinery Company Limited.
1994: Shandong Molong Petroleum Machinery Company Limited was established.
2006: It was listed on the Growth Enterprise Market of the Hong Kong Stock Exchange.
2007: It was listed on the Main Board of the Hong Kong Stock Exchange.

Link
Shandong Molong Petroleum Machinery Company Limited

References

Manufacturing companies of China
Companies based in Shandong
Chemical companies established in 1987
Non-renewable resource companies established in 1987
H shares
Companies listed on the Hong Kong Stock Exchange
Privately held companies of China